Callistopteris is a fern genus in the family Hymenophyllaceae. The genus is accepted in the Pteridophyte Phylogeny Group classification of 2016 (PPG I) but not by some other sources, which sink it into a broadly defined Trichomanes.

Taxonomy
The genus Callistopteris was erected by Edwin Copeland in 1938. Its status, like other genera in the family Hymenophyllaceae, remains disputed. The Pteridophyte Phylogeny Group classification of 2016 (PPG I) accepts the genus, placing it in the subfamily Trichomanoideae, and saying that there are five species. , the Checklist of Ferns and Lycophytes of the World lists six species, whereas Plants of the World Online sinks the genus into Trichomanes.

Species 
, the Checklist of Ferns and Lycophytes of the World accepted the following species:
Callistopteris apiifolia (C.Presl) Copel.
Callistopteris baldwinii (D.C.Eaton) Copel.
Callistopteris baueriana (Endl.) Copel.
Callistopteris calyculata Copel.
Callistopteris polyantha (Hook.) Copel.
Callistopteris superba (Backh. ex T.Moore) Ebihara & K.Iwats.

See also 
 List of fern families

References 

Hymenophyllales
Fern genera